Matka is a village in the municipality of Saraj, North Macedonia.

Demographics
According to the 2021 census, the village had a total of 466 inhabitants. Ethnic groups in the village include:

Albanians 248
Macedonians 157
Bosniaks 5
Serbs 1
Others 55

See also
Matka Canyon

References

External links

Villages in Saraj Municipality
Albanian communities in North Macedonia